Sascha Klein (born 12 September 1985) is a German diver. Competing in the 2008 Summer Olympics, he won a silver medal in the men's synchronized 10 metre platform with teammate Patrick Hausding. At the 2016 Summer Olympics, he competed in men's 10 m platform where he finished in 9th place. He also competed in men's synchronized 10 m platform with teammate Patrick Hausding. They finished in 4th place.

References

External links

1985 births
German male divers
Divers at the 2008 Summer Olympics
Divers at the 2012 Summer Olympics
Divers at the 2016 Summer Olympics
Olympic divers of Germany
Medalists at the 2008 Summer Olympics
Olympic medalists in diving
Olympic silver medalists for Germany
People from Eschweiler
Sportspeople from Cologne (region)
Living people
World Aquatics Championships medalists in diving
21st-century German people